Love Me Again is the 9th installment of the Precious Hearts Romances Presents series. The series stars Johan Santos, Cathy Remperas, Valerie Concepcion and Tom Rodriguez. It is set to be broadcast on ABS-CBN's Kapamilya Gold afternoon block from April 5, 2010 to May 14, 2010.

Synopsis
When Precy comes home for a two-week vacation, she learns that her brother Donnie is devastated because he was dumped by his girlfriend, Pauleen. Precy learns that Pauleen dumped Donnie for another man.

Being a protective "ate", Precy decides to do something about it. With the help of her friend Cardo, Precy investigates and learns that Pauleen's new boyfriend is Chad.

Chad used to be in love with Precy and Precy sees this as a chance for revenge. Precy will let Pauleen feel what Donnie felt - to be dumped and be broken-hearted. So Precy decides to seduce Chad and steal him from Pauleen.

The problem is, he is no longer the Chad she used to know, the Chad who was so in love with her.

Precy will do anything to make chad want her again, realizing that she's doing this not for her brother anymore, but her own self. Because Precy has already fallen in love with Chad.

Cast and characters

Main cast
 Valerie Concepcion as Preciosa "Precy" Pilapil: a 26-year-old project manager of a condominium. She is an overprotective sister that sometimes she becomes too controlling. She and her brother became orphans when they were young and Precy stood as his brother's both mother and father. She is quite an old maid and had no boyfriend since birth.
 Tom Rodriguez as Chadilton "Chad" Barrera: a 27-year-old owner of a resto-bar. He is a former suitor of Precy and is willing to do anything for her. But when she dumped him, he became a changed man.
 Johan Santos as Donato "Donnie" Pilapil: a 21-year-old fresh graduate who is preparing to take the board exam. He got brokenhearted when his girlfriend dumped him and ever since then he lost his way and dealt with depression by spending his time with drinking with friends and being immature.
 Cathy Remperas as Pauleen Dimagulangan: a 21-year-old ex-girlfriend of Donnie who is now the girlfriend of Chad. She works as a promo girl for Chad's resto-bar.

Supporting cast
 Nina Ricci Alagao as Keanna Mondragon
 Bettina Carlos as Almira "Al" Ocampo
 Maria Isabel Lopez as Sonia Barrera
 Ramil Rodriguez as Eugene Barrera
 Minnie Aguilar as Argentina "Tina" Dimagulangan
 Kathleen Lopena-Ortega as Helene Suarez
 Archie Alemania as Cardo 
 Toffi Santos as Rod
 Kenny Santos as Mark
 JM Lagumbay as Ted
 Ahron Villena as Peter

Guest appearances
 Tibo Jumalon as Macario
 Hermes Bautista as Aries
 Kontin Roque as Inggo
 Ching Arellano as Subas

See also
Precious Hearts Romances Presents

References

ABS-CBN drama series
Philippine romantic comedy television series
Television shows based on books
2010 Philippine television series debuts
2010 Philippine television series endings
Filipino-language television shows
Television shows filmed in the Philippines